Benjamin Scott Barnes (born March 30, 1975) is an American politician who represents District 21 in the Maryland House of Delegates. A Democrat, he was first elected in 2006 and reelected in 2010, 2014, and 2018.

Background
Raised by a single mother, Barnes grew up in Prince George's County in Maryland. He graduated from Eleanor Roosevelt High School in 1993 before enrolling at the University of North Carolina at Greensboro, where he earned a Bachelor of Arts degree in economics and political science in 1998.

Barnes says he first got involved with politics as a child, attending pro-choice marches in Washington, D.C. with his family. Barnes began working in politics shortly after graduating, first at People for the American Way as an organizer from 1999 to 2000. Afterwards, Barnes worked as a political and legislative advisor to Senate President Thomas V. Miller Jr., later earning a promotion to Deputy Legislative Director. During his time with Miller, Barnes attended night classes at the University of Baltimore School of Law, graduating with a Juris Doctor in 2003. Barnes was admitted to the Maryland Bar in 2004, and clerked for Judge James J. Lombardi in the Prince George's County Circuit Court, 7th Judicial Circuit until 2005. before assuming his current position as a senior attorney at the John Hall Law Group in Bowie, Maryland.

In the legislature
Barnes was sworn into the Maryland House of Delegates on January 10, 2007. He has served as the Chief Deputy Majority Whip since 2013 and as the chair of the House Appropriations Committee since 2022. Barnes is currently a member of the Rules and Executive Nominations Committee and the Spending Affordability Committee, and was previously a member of the House Judiciary Committee and the Economic Matters Committee.

During the 2008 presidential campaign, Barnes was elected and served as a pledged delegate for Hillary Clinton to the 2008 Democratic National Convention in Denver, Colorado.

Committee assignments
 Chief Deputy Majority Whip, 2013–present (deputy majority whip, 2011–2012)
 Chair, Appropriations Committee, 2022–present (member, 2015–present; chair, oversight committee on pensions, 2015–2019; chair, education & economic development subcommittee, 2019–present, vice-chair, 2015–2019; chair, capital budget subcommittee, 2021–present, member, 2015–present, vice-chair, 2020)
 House Special Committee on Drug and Alcohol Abuse, 2007–present
 House Chair, Special Joint Committee on Pensions, 2015–2021 (member, 2021–present)
 Member, Rules and Executive Nominations Committee, 2019–present
 Member, Spending Affordability Committee, 2020–present (chair, 2019)
 Member, Judiciary Committee, 2007–2011 (civil law & procedure subcommittee, 2007–2011)
 Member, Economic Matters Committee, 2011–2015 (banking, economic development, science & technology subcommittee, 2011; public utilities subcommittee, 2011–2015; workers' compensation subcommittee, 2012–2015)
 Member, Commission on Maryland Retirement Security and Savings, 2015–2016
 House Chair, Spending Affordability Committee, 2016–2019

Other memberships
 1st vice-chair, Prince George's County Delegation, 2012–2014 (law enforcement & state-appointed boards committee, 2007–2008, 2011; Washington suburban sanitary commission committee, 2008–2010; vice-chair, Maryland-national capital park & planning commission committee, 2012; chair, county affairs committee, 2017–present, member, 2013–present)
 Member, Anne Arundel County Delegation, 2007–present (capital budget committee, 2018)
 Member, Maryland Legislative Latino Caucus, 2019–present

Personal life
Barnes is married to Caitlin McDonough, a partner with the lobbyist law firm Harris Jones & Malone. and daughter to Former Secretary of State John McDonough. The couple has three sons.

Political positions

Education
During the 2019 legislative session, Barnes introduced legislation that would expand the University System of Maryland Board of Regents to include the Maryland Secretary of Commerce, two members appointed by the president of the Maryland Senate and the Speaker of the Maryland House of Delegates, and a second student member. The bill passed both chambers unanimously and was signed into law by Governor Hogan on April 30, 2019.

In January 2020, Barnes proposed an amendment to change how much funding the state would provide toward education funding in Baltimore and Prince George's County, resulting in an annual increase of $146.9 million and a $202.9 million respectively by 2030.

Barnes supported legislation introduced during the 2021 legislative session that would allow college athletes to profit off their name, image, and likeness.

Gun control
During the 2013 legislative session, Barnes voted to pass legislation that would require fingerprinting of gun buyers, place new limits on firearm purchases by the mentally ill, and ban assault weapons and magazines that hold more than 10 bullets.

During the 2016 legislative session, Barnes introduced legislation to ban firearm possession on the campuses of public colleges and universities, with exceptions for police officers and security personnel. The bill passed the House of Delegates by a 89–49 vote on April 4, 2018.

Social issues
Barnes was the original House sponsor of the Civil Marriage Protection Act, arguing in 2011 that Maryland was discriminating against gay couples by not allowing them to marry. He voted in favor of the legislation when it was reintroduced in the 2012 legislative session as an Administration bill under Governor Martin O'Malley.

During the 2013 legislative session, Barnes voted to pass legislation that would repeal the death penalty in Maryland.

Taxes
During the 2013 legislative session, Barnes voted to pass legislation that would raise gas taxes to replenish the state's transportation fund.

Electoral history

References

Democratic Party members of the Maryland House of Delegates
1975 births
Living people
21st-century American politicians
University of Baltimore School of Law alumni